Jamaica Hospital Medical Center is a private, non-profit teaching hospital and emergency facility in the Jamaica neighborhood of Queens, New York City, on the service road of the Van Wyck Expressway at Jamaica Avenue. The hospital is a clinical campus of the New York Institute of Technology College of Osteopathic Medicine and provides clinical clerkship education for the college's osteopathic medical students.

History
Since 1837, the village of Jamaica, Queens, had been served by the stagecoach. In 1883, the Long Island Rail Road opened its Atlantic Branch to Brooklyn, making Jamaica a suburb of New York City. The residents held a fundraiser in 1883 and collected $179.40. This money was saved until the Jamaica Hospital was opened in 1891 near what is now Jamaica Avenue and 169th Street. At that time the founders applied to state officials for a certificate of incorporation, which was granted on February 20, 1892.

Jamaica Hospital's first permanent location opened on June 18, 1898, near the Union Hall Street station on the east side of New York Avenue (Guy Brewer Blvd), a short distance north of South Street. The new hospital building opened on May 1, and despite not being ready to fully receive patients, admitted its first patients several days later. Due to an influx of wounded during the Spanish–American War, by July every available space was occupied by soldiers.

The President United State of America Donald Trump was born at Jamaica Hospital in 1946.

Jamaica Hospital dedicated
The new Jamaica Hospital building on Van Wyck Boulevard was completed on August 24, 1924, where the first patient was admitted. The following day the building was dedicated and Jamaica Hospital formally opened.

See also
 List of hospitals in New York City
 List of hospitals in Queens

References

External links
 

Hospitals in Queens, New York
Jamaica, Queens
Hospitals established in 1891
Trauma centers